The 1905 Prime Minister's Resignation Honours were awards announced on 9 December 1905 to mark the exit of Prime Minister Arthur James Balfour, who resigned on 5 December.

The recipients of honours are displayed here as they were styled before their new honour, and arranged by honour, with classes (Knight, Knight Grand Cross, etc.) and then divisions (Military, Civil, etc.) as appropriate.

Viscounts 
The Lord Tredegar
The Right Hon. Sir Michael Hicks Beach

Barons 
The Right Hon. C. T. Ritchie   
The Right Hon. Sir W. H. Walrond   
Sir H. Meysey Thompson   
Sir H. de Stern   
Sir A. Harmsworth   
Edmund Beckett Faber   
W. H. Grenfell

Privy Councillor 

The Solicitor General the Right Hon. Sir E. H. Carson   
J. S. Sandars
Victor C. W. Cavendish   
Sir Charles Dalrymple, 1st Baronet 
Lieut.-Col. Mark Lockwood

Baronet 
C. Morrison-Bell
Benjamin Cohen   
R. P. Cooper 
Thomas Leigh Hare   
Lindsay Hogg   
W. B. Hulton
J. Grant Lawson   
Francis Ley
Edward Mann
John Davison Milburn
Herbert Praed

Knight 

W. J. Bull   
C. Kinloch-Cooke
Major W. E. Evans-Gordon   
S. Faire
Charles Frederick Claverhouse Graham
F. W. Lowe   
H. E. Moss
Col. C. Wyndham Murray   
Major Harry North
Henry Edward Randall
J. S. Randles   
J. Robinson
W. H. Vaudrey
Edgcombe Venning

Order of the Bath

Commander of the Order of the Bath (CB) 
Malcolm G. Ramsay, Treasury
J. J. Taylor, Irish Office

Order of St Michael and St George

Knight Commander of the Order of St Michael and St George (KCMG) 
John Henniker Heaton,

Privy Councillor (Ireland) 
To be sworn of the Privy Council in Ireland:

Sir R. Blennerhassett, Bt. 
Sir F. E. W. Macnaghten    
Sir Patrick Coll    
J. H. M. Campbell    Attorney-General for Ireland

References

1905 in British politics
Prime Minister's Resignation Honours
1905 awards